Sandeep Kumar (born 12 August 1988) represented India in the Men's Lightweight Double Sculls at the 2012 London Olympics with teammate Manjeet Singh.

References

Indian male rowers
Rowers at the 2012 Summer Olympics
Olympic rowers of India
Living people
Rowers at the 2010 Asian Games
1988 births
Asian Games competitors for India